Jacob Crocheron (August 23, 1774 – December 27, 1849) was an American farmer and law enforcement officer who served one term as a U.S. Representative from New York, United States from 1829 to 1831.

He was the brother of Henry Crocheron.

Biography 
Born on Staten Island, Richmond County, New York, Crocheron engaged in agricultural pursuits.
Sheriff of Richmond County in 1802, 1811, and again in 1821.

Crocheron was a presidential elector in the 1836 presidential election.

Congress 
Crocheron was elected as a Jacksonian to the Twenty-first Congress (March 4, 1829 – March 3, 1831).

Death 
He died in Richmond County, Staten Island, on December 27, 1849.
He was interred in St. Andrew's Churchyard, Staten Island, New York.

References

1774 births
1849 deaths
Jacksonian members of the United States House of Representatives from New York (state)
1836 United States presidential electors
Members of the United States House of Representatives from New York (state)